Sexual maturity is the capability of an organism to reproduce. In humans, it is related to both puberty and  adulthood. However, puberty is the process of biological sexual maturation, while the concept of adulthood is generally based on broader cultural definitions.

Most multicellular organisms are unable to sexually reproduce at birth (animals) or germination (e.g. plants): depending on the species, it may be days, weeks, or years until they have developed enough to be able to do so. Also, certain cues may trigger an organism to become sexually mature. They may be external, such as drought (certain plants), or internal, such as percentage of body fat (certain animals). (Such internal cues are not to be confused with hormones, which directly produce sexual maturity – the production/release of those hormones is triggered by such cues.)

Role of reproductive organs 
Sexual maturity is brought about by a maturing of the reproductive organs and the production of gametes. It may also be accompanied by a growth spurt or other physical changes which distinguish the immature organism from its adult form. In animals these are termed secondary sex characteristics, and often represent an increase in sexual dimorphism.

After sexual maturity is achieved, some organisms become infertile, or even change their sex. Some organisms are hermaphrodites and may or may not be able to "completely" mature and/or to produce viable offspring. Also, while in many organisms sexual maturity is strongly linked to age, many other factors are involved, and it is possible for some to display most or all of the characteristics of the adult form without being sexually mature. Conversely it is also possible for the "immature" form of an organism to reproduce. This is called progenesis, in which sexual development occurs faster than other physiological development (in contrast, the term neoteny refers to when non-sexual development is slowed – but the result is the same - the retention of juvenile characteristics into adulthood).

Puberty vs. sexual maturity 
In some animals, there is a difference between puberty and sexual maturity. For example, in bulls, puberty is characterized by the accelerated growth of the genital system, an increase in luteinizing hormone (LH) secretion, and the onset of spermatogenesis. Sexual maturity, however, signifies the attainment of full reproductive capacity, which may take up to 6-9 months after puberty.

See also
Gonadosomatic index

References

Sexual reproduction
Reproduction
Sexuality
Adulthood